Taeniopteryx nivalis, the boreal willowfly, is a species of winter stonefly in the family Taeniopterygidae. It is found in North America.

References

External links

 

Taeniopterygidae
Articles created by Qbugbot
Insects described in 1847